Ottorino Sartor (18 September 1945 – 2 June 2021) was a Peruvian professional footballer who played as a  goalkeeper.

Club career
Sartor played for Defensor Arica, a Lima-based team and Atlético Miguel.
He played his club football for Colegio Nacional de Iquitos.

International career
Sartor competed for the Peru national football team at the 1978 FIFA World Cup, and obtained a total number of 27 caps for his native country in the years 1966 to 1979.

He was the starting goalkeeper in Peru’s 1975 Copa America championship team.

Death
Sartor died on 2 June 2021 aged 76.

See also
1978 FIFA World Cup squads

References

1945 births
2021 deaths
People from Lima Region
Association football goalkeepers
Peruvian footballers
Peru international footballers
1975 Copa América players
1978 FIFA World Cup players
Copa América-winning players
Peruvian Primera División players
José Gálvez FBC footballers
Atlético Chalaco footballers
Club Universitario de Deportes footballers
Colegio Nacional Iquitos footballers
Coronel Bolognesi footballers
Sport Boys footballers